The initialism AWPC may refer to:

Amateur World Powerlifting Congress
American Writing Paper Company
AgustaWestland Philadelphia Corporation, a wholly owned subsidiary of Leonardo Helicopters